Spreetal (German) or Sprjewiny Doł (Upper Sorbian) is a municipality in the district of Bautzen, in Saxony, Germany.

The municipality is part of the recognized Sorbian settlement area in Saxony. Upper Sorbian has an official status next to German, all villages bear names in both languages.

References 

Populated places in Bautzen (district)